Anne Marie Balsamo (born January 7, 1959) is a writer who focuses on the connections between art, culture, gender, and technology.

Education 
Balsamo attended graduate school at the University of Illinois at Urbana-Champaign where she earned her Ph.D. in Communications Research.

Career 
Anne Balsamo is the former Dean of the School of Arts Technology and Emerging Communication at the University of Texas at Dallas, she still serves as a Professor at the school. Previously she was Professor of media studies as well as Dean of the School of Media Studies at The New School for Public Engagement in New York City. Prior to that, Balsamo had concurrent appointments at the Annenberg School of Communication and Journalism and the Interactive Media Division of the School of Cinematic Arts at the University of Southern California, where she taught courses on interactive media, design, and technology. Also, at the Annenberg Innovation Lab, she oversaw Emergent Technologies. She was also the editor for an ebook series, Imprint, associated with Annenberg Press.

Previously she was a member of a research group called RED (Research on Experimental Documents) at Xerox PARC, where she worked on new kinds of reading devices, among other projects. An interactive exhibit on RED's work for which she was project manager and media designer toured U.S. science and technology museums from 2000 to 2003. She  went on to co-found Onomy Labs, a Silicon Valley firm that designs interactive cultural technologies.

Balsamo has been an entrepreneur, author, educator, and new media designer at various times in her life but is best known as a writer who analyzes technology and culture from a feminist perspective. One of her books, Technologies of the Gendered Body, notoriously begins with the sentence: "My mother was a computer," underlining the fact that before 'computer' became a term for a machine, it was the term used for the people (mainly women) who kept the machines running and, in some cases, wrote programs for them. In particular, she addresses the technological control of women's bodies through, for example, cosmetic surgery or the medicalization of pregnancy.

Balsamo advocates for educational initiatives that expand access to the spheres in which future technologies are imagined and defined; along these lines, she and Alexandra Juhasz co-founded FemTechNet, a network of scholars and artists who work on issues related to technology and gender. John Seely Brown, former chief scientist of Xerox Corporation and Director of Xerox Palo Alto Research Center (PARC) argues that Balsamo "portrays both the necessity and the challenge of cultivating the technological imagination in all of us...Her insights into expanding the traditional considerations of socio-technical design to consider issues of culture are coming at a critical time." Lawrence Grossberg, author of Studies In the Future, argues that "Balsamo maps the concrete complexities of specific design processes, and opens up new ways of thinking about and teaching technocultures in relation to broader socio-political fields."

Selected bibliography

Books

Chapters in books

Journal articles

References

External links 
 Profile page: Anne Balsamo The New School for Public Engagement
 Profile page: Anne Balsamo Dana and David Dornsife College of Letters, Arts and Sciences, University of Southern California

1959 births
Cyberpunk culture
Living people
University of Illinois Urbana-Champaign College of Media alumni
The New School faculty
University of Southern California faculty
Scientists at PARC (company)